The 40th National Film Awards was presented on 24 July 2017 by the Ministry of Information, Bangladesh to felicitate the best of Bangladeshi films released in the year 2015. The awards were given to 29 personnel in 26 categories.

List of winners

References

External links

National Film Awards (Bangladesh) ceremonies
2015 film awards
2017 awards in Bangladesh
2017 in Dhaka
July 2017 events in Bangladesh